Davis Island is an island about  long, situated in a position which blocks much of the channel between Brabant Island and Liège Island, in the Palmer Archipelago. It is separated from Liège Island on the north by Zlogosh Passage, and from Albena Peninsula, Brabant Island on the south by Sumer Passage.

The island was photographed and roughly charted by the Belgian Antarctic Expedition, 1897–99. The naming, by J.B. Charcot, leader of the French Antarctic Expedition, 1903–05, honors Walter G. Davis, director of the Argentine government meteorological office at the time of the French exploration.

See also 
 Composite Antarctic Gazetteer
 List of Antarctic islands south of 60° S
 Scientific Committee on Antarctic Research
 Territorial claims in Antarctica

References
 

Islands of the Palmer Archipelago
Liège Island
Brabant Island